Merd-e Now (also known as Mardūnow and Merdūnū) is a village in Fatuyeh Rural District, in the Central District of Bastak County, Hormozgan Province, Iran. At the 2006 census, its population was 622, in 147 families.

References 

Populated places in Bastak County